Powys is the largest administrative county in Wales. With over a quarter of Wales's land area, covering much of the eastern half of the country, it is a county of remote uplands, low population and no coastline. It was created in more or less its current form in 1974, and is the only one of the large county units created at that time to have been carried forward intact at the 1996 local government re-organisation. It comprises three historic counties, namely Montgomeryshire, Radnorshire, and most of Brecknockshire. There are 950 Scheduled monuments within the county, which is far more than can be sensibly covered in one list. Each of the 3 historic counties is therefore listed separately, and each of these has two lists - one for the prehistoric sites and one for the Roman, medieval and post-medieval sites.

This list shows the sites in Brecknockshire dating to Roman, medieval, post-medieval through to modern times. The area is also historically known as Breconshire, (not including those parts that are no longer in Powys). Brecknockshire is the southern third of Powys, and encompasses the Brecon Beacons National Park, the Black Mountains and Mynydd Epynt. The River Wye separates it from Radnorshire. There are 135 scheduled monuments on this list. Of these, 10 are Roman, all of which are military in purpose, being either roads or forts and camps. Nine date from the Early Middle Ages, mainly inscribed stones but also including a Crannog. There are 78 sites from the post-Norman Medieval period, including castles, mottes and moated sites, churches, town defenses and agricultural holdings. The 38 post-medieval sites are even more diverse, covering bridges, tramways, aqueducts, agricultural sites and lost villages, lead mines, coal mines, industrial sites, and two war-time features from the 1940s.

The 254 scheduled sites dating to prehistoric periods are listed at List of prehistoric scheduled monuments in Powys (Brecknockshire)

Scheduled monuments have statutory protection. It is illegal to disturb the ground surface or any standing remains. The compilation of the list is undertaken by Cadw Welsh Historic Monuments, which is an executive agency of the National Assembly of Wales. The list of scheduled monuments below is supplied by Cadw with additional material from RCAHMW and Clwyd-Powys Archaeological Trust.

Roman to modern scheduled monuments in Brecknockshire
The list is sorted by date, and then by Community so that sites of similar age and locality are placed near each other. Clicking on the heading arrows will sort the list by that information.

See also
List of Cadw properties
List of castles in Wales
List of hill forts in Wales
Historic houses in Wales
List of monastic houses in Wales
List of museums in Wales
List of Roman villas in Wales

References
Coflein is the online database of RCAHMW: Royal Commission on the Ancient and Historical Monuments of Wales, CPAT is the Clwyd-Powys Archaeological Trust, Cadw is the Welsh Historic Monuments Agency

Powys
Buildings and structures in Powys